Disney Cinema (or Disney Cinéma) was a French television channel and an on-demand service owned by The Walt Disney Company Limited in London. This channel replaced the previous Disney Cinemagic channel in that area on May 8, 2015.

This service used to sit alongside Disney Channel, Disney Junior and Disney XD (which also shut down in 2020) on the Canal+ platform.

The channel was available exclusively on Canal+.

Regular Disney films, launch on the channel in the first pay TV window, ten months after their theatrical release. Disney films appear eight months after their theatrical release (22 months for Star Wars films).

In 2020, the channel closed along with Disney XD.

See also 

 Disney Cinemagic

References

External links
 Disney Cinema 

Television channels and stations established in 2015
Television channels and stations disestablished in 2020
Disney television networks
Television stations in France
Defunct television channels in France